Kouloun is the name of several places in Africa:

Kouloun, Guinea 
Kouloun, Mali -commune and city
Kouloun, Niger

See also
Kowloon